Kaniyur is a suburb of palani which is also a town panchayat in Tirupur District in the Indian state of Tamil Nadu. Kaniyur is also called Dravida Iyakkathin Thotti. It is one of the 'K' villages located near to [Udmelpettai].

It is located on the banks of the Amaravathi River in Tirupur District.
Kaniyur had a Sivan temple. It was an ancient period temple( approx. 1200AD). Kaniyur has an old mosque which was 128-years-old in 2015.  

Agriculture is the main occupation of people. Sugar cane, rice, vethala kodikal are the main crops in Kaniyur.

Kaniyur is the junction of many villages to connect the town of Udumalpet, Dharapuram, Kadathur, Keeranur, Madathukulam and Palani.

Sri Venkatakrishna School celebrated its 100th year recently. Krishna Yajur Veda Padasala is in this village. President Abdul Kalam has visited this school.

Several Leaders of the Dravidian movement have been born in this town namely K.A. Murugesan, K. A. Mathialagan and K. A. Krishnasamy.

Demographics
 India census, Kaniyur had a population of 15,200. Males constitute 49% of the population and females 51%. Kaniyur has an average literacy rate of 68%, higher than the national average of 59.5%: male literacy is 75%, and female literacy is 61%. In Kaniyur, 10% of the population is under 6 years of age.

See also
Kaniyooru

References

External links
 https://web.archive.org/web/20090829003438/http://www.census.tn.nic.in/pca2001.aspx

Cities and towns in Tiruppur district
Suburbs of Coimbatore